China Table Tennis Super League (CTTSL) is the top table tennis division under the Chinese Table Tennis Association.

The last finisher of the CTTSL will be relegated to the China Table Tennis Jia League A Group. The top two finishers of the Jia League A Group will have extra games with the second last finishers of the CTTSL for two positions in the CTTSL.

Teams

Men's league
In 2015 China Table Tennis Super League Teams:
 Luneng - Zhang Jike, Hao Shuai, Zhang Chao, Fang Bo, Wu Hao
 Jiangsu - Zheng Peifeng, Kong Lingxuan, Lin Chen, Dimitrij Ovtcharov, Kim Minseok
 Ningbo - Ma Long, Yan An, Lin Gaoyuan, Lvy Xiang
 Bayi - Fan Zhendong, Zhou Yu, Xu Chenhao, Zhou Kai, Zhang Yang
 Shanghai - Xu Xin, Shang Kun, Zhao Zihao, Chen Zhiyang, Zhang Yang
 Weiqiao - Liang Jingkun, Cui Qinglei, Yu Ziyang, Zhang Yudong, Liu Yi, Zhao Qihao, Timo Boll
 Tianjin - Ma Te, Liu Dingshuo, Wei Shihao, Chuang Chih Yuan
 Guangdong - Liu Jikang, Yin Hang, Liu Yanan, Joo Saehyuk, Wong Chun Ting
 Bazhou - Ren Hao, Zhai Chao, Cheng Jingqi, Fan Shengpeng, Wang Chuqin, Stephane Ouaiche
 Sichuan - Xu Ruifeng, Zhu Linfeng, Lai Jiaxin, Tang Yushi, Chen Chien An

In 2014, the 10 teams are:
 Bazhou Hairun (霸州海润) playing in Bazhou City, Hebei
 Bayi Dashang (八一大商) playing in Dalian, Liaoning
 Guangdong Chenjing (广东陈静) playing in Guangzhou, Guangdong
 Jiangsu Zhongchao (江苏中超) playing in Changzhou, Jiangsu or Huai'an, Jiangsu
 Ningbo Haitian (宁波海天) playing in Anji County, Zhejiang or Wenzhou, Zhejiang 
 Shandong Luneng (山东鲁能) playing in Jinan, Shandong
 Shandong Weiqiao (山东魏桥) playing in Binzhou, Shandong
 Shanghai Juneyao (上海均瑶) playing in Shanghai
 Sichuan Changhong (四川长虹) playing in Shifang, Sichuan
 Tianjin Hao'an (天津豪安) playing in Tianjin

In 2008, the 9 teams are:
 Zhe Shang Bank (浙商银行) playing in Hangzhou City, Zhejiang
 Bayi Gongshang Bank (八一工商银行) playing in Dalian, Liaoning
 Jinzhou Bank (锦州银行) playing in Jinzhou, Liaoning
 Haining Pegecheng Hong Xiang (海宁皮革城鸿翔) playing in Haining, Zhejiang
 Ningbo Beilun Haitian (宁波北仑海天) playing in Anji County, Zhejiang or Wenzhou, Zhejiang 
 Luneng Zhongchao Dianlan (鲁能中超电缆) playing in Jinan, Shandong
 Jiangsu Jiangnan Dianlan (江苏江南电缆) playing in Yixing, Jiangsu
 Shanghai Gaunshengyuan (上海冠生园) playing in Shanghai
 Sichuan Quanxing (四川全兴) playing in Shifang, Sichuan

Women's league
In 2014, the 10 teams are:
 Bayi Jizhong (八一冀中) playing in Dongping County, Shandong
 Beijing Shougang (北京首钢) playing in Weishan County, Shandong or Beijing
 Churin Leadfoods (秋林格瓦斯) playing in Changchun, Jilin
 Dalian Haichang (大连海昌) playing in Dalian, Liaoning
 Datong Jindi (大同金地) playing in Datong, Shanxi
 Guangdong Ersha (广东二沙) playing in Guangzhou, Guangdong
 Jinhua Bank (金华银行) playing in Jinhua, Zhejiang
 Ordos Eastern Road and Bridge (鄂尔多斯东方路桥) playing in Ejin Horo Banner, Inner Mongolia
 Shandong Luneng (山东鲁能) playing in Jinan, Shandong
 Shanxi Datuhe (山西大土河) playing in Lüliang, Shanxi

Foreign players
A number of foreign players have played in the league.

Foreign-born players
 Men's league
 : Vladimir Samsonov (2006)
 : Jean-Michel Saive (2006)
 : Chuang Chih-yuan (2006, 2009-2010, 2013-2014), Chiang Peng-lung (2000/01-2002, 2005-2006)
 : Michael Maze (2005)
 : Timo Boll (2005-2006, 2011, 2013-2014), Dimitrij Ovtcharov (2013-2014)
 : Jun Mizutani (2008, 2010-2011), Kōji Matsushita (2005)
 : Adrian Crișan (2006)
 : Joo Se-hyuk (2003/04-2006, 2009-2014), Oh Sang-eun (2005-2006, 2008, 2010), Ryu Seung-min (2000/01, 2005-2006), Lee Jung-woo (2006)
 : Jörgen Persson (2002, 2012)

 Women's league
 : Cheng I-ching (2013-2014), Huang Yi-hua (2002)
 : Tamara Boroš (2006)
 : Ai Fukuhara (2005-2006, 2010-2011), An Konishi (2000/01-2005), Yuka Nishii (2002), Miu Hirano (2016)
 : Ri Myong-sun (2014)
 : Kim Kyung-ah (2009-2011)
 : Ariel Hsing (2014)

Naturalized Chinese players
There have also been many players from Mainland China, who at some point in his or her career became a citizen of another country or territory.
 Men's league
 : Wenguan Johnny Huang
 : Jiang Tianyi, Cheung Yuk, Ko Lai Chak, Tang Peng, Li Ching, Leung Chu Yan
 : Yo Kan, Kazuhiro Chan, Kaii Yoshida
 : Yin Jingyuan, Yang Zi, Gao Ning, Li Hu, Zhan Jian
 : Wang Yang

 Women's league
 : Li Qiangbing
 : Chen Jing
 : Shan Xiaona (also a Singaporean citizen at one point)
 : Tie Ya Na, Jiang Huajun, Lin Ling, Zhang Rui
 : Li Jiao
 : Yu Mengyu, Feng Tianwei, Li Jiawei, Wang Yuegu, Jing Junhong, Shan Xiaona (later a German citizen)
 : Seok Ha-jung, Dang Ye-seo
 : Gao Jun

Chinese players
 Men's league
 Zhang Jike, Zhang Chao (table tennis), Ma Lin,  Fang Bo, Song Hongyuan, Li Muqiao, Wang Hao, Lei Zhenhua, Hao Shuai, Xu Xin, Qiu Yike, Wei Yan Tao, Zhang Yibo, Shan Xiaona, Ma Long, Wang Jianjun, Han Yang

References

External links
Official website

Table tennis competitions in China
Sports leagues in China
Professional sports leagues in China